Bill Williams Mountain is a peak located about  west of Flagstaff and  south of Williams, Arizona in the Kaibab National Forest. It is named for Old Bill Williams, a scout, guide, and mountain man, who lived in the 1800s. It is part of the San Francisco volcanic field.

References

External links
 

Landforms of Coconino County, Arizona
Volcanoes of Arizona
Protected areas of Coconino County, Arizona
Kaibab National Forest
Mountains of Coconino County, Arizona